Oppey Abbey (November 5, 1945February 22, 2019) was a Ghanaian politician and a member of the Fourth Parliament of the Fourth Republic representing the Awutu-Senya Constituency in the Central Region of Ghana.

Early life and education 
Abbey was born in Awutu Senya West in the Central Region of Ghana on November 5, 1945. He obtained a Diploma in the Kwame Nkrumah University of Science and Technology after he studied engineering.

Career 
Abbey, a mechanical engineer was the former MP for Awutu-Senya, and was the first to win the seat on the ticket of the New Patriotic Party (NPP) in 2004 and made his entrance into Parliament on the January 7, 2005.

Politics 
Abbey was first elected into Parliament during the December 2005 Ghanaian General Elections Ghanaian on the Ticket of the New Patriotic Party as a member of Parliament for the Awutu-Senya Constituency with 32,539 votes out of the 64,740 valid votes casts representing 50.30%. He was defeated by David Nana Larbie of the National Democratic Congress in 2008.

He served on the Foreign Affairs and Business Committees of Parliament.

Personal life 
Abbey was a Christian.  He died on February 22, 2019.

References 

Kwame Nkrumah University of Science and Technology alumni
21st-century Ghanaian politicians
People from Central Region (Ghana)
1945 births
2019 deaths
Ghanaian Christians
New Patriotic Party politicians
20th-century Ghanaian engineers
Ghanaian MPs 2005–2009